Penelope Dransart    is an anthropologist, archaeologist, and historian specialising in South American anthropology and the study of castles. Until 2016 she was a Reader at University of Wales Trinity Saint David. She is Honorary Reader at the University of Aberdeen. Dransart was elected as a Fellow of the Society of Antiquaries of London in 1998. She has written or edited several books, including Earth, Water, Fleece and Fabric: An Ethnography and Archaeology of Andean Camelid Herding (2002, Routledge).

Dransart completed a DPhil at the University of Oxford in 1991, titled Fibre to fabric: the role of fibre in Camelid economies in prehispanic and contemporary Chile. Between 1992 and 1993, Dransart was a research fellow at the Institute of Latin American Studies. She has conducted fieldwork in the Andes since the 1980s and at Fetternear Palace in Scotland between 1995 and 2013 as part of the Scottish Episcopal Palaces Project. Dransart guest curated an exhibition about Fetternear at Blairs Museum in Aberdeen. She is part of the permanent committee of the Colloques Château Gaillard, a biannual conference for castellologists. Dransart is also Editor for Archaeology and Art for Studia Celtica, an academic journal about Celtic studies.

Select publications

 

 

 

Edited

References

External links

Penny Dransart (2002). Earth, Water, Fleece and Fabric: an ethnography and archaeology of Andean camelid herding [data-set]. York: Archaeology Data Service [distributor] https://doi.org/10.5284/1000347
Wenner-Gren Foundation grantee: Dransart, Penelope Zoe
Lochleven Castle and the incarceration of Mary Queen of Scots, 2021 talk by Dr. Dransart

Dransart, Penelope
British women anthropologists
21st-century British archaeologists
British anthropologists
Fellows of the Society of Antiquaries of London
Year of birth missing (living people)
Living people
21st-century British women writers
Alumni of the University of Oxford
Castellologists
British women historians
Academics of the University of Wales Trinity Saint David
Academics of the University of Aberdeen